Peter Anton Orlovsky (July 8, 1933 – May 30, 2010) was an American poet and actor. He was the long-time partner of Allen Ginsberg.

Early life and career
Orlovsky was born in the Lower East Side of New York City, the son of Katherine (née Schwarten) and Oleg Orlovsky, a Russian immigrant. He was raised in poverty and was forced to drop out of Newtown High School in his senior year so he could support his impoverished family. After many odd jobs, he began working as an orderly at Creedmoor State Mental Hospital, known today as Creedmoor Psychiatric Center.

In 1953, Orlovsky was drafted into the United States Army for the Korean War at nineteen years old. Army psychiatrists ordered his transfer off the front to work as a medic in a San Francisco hospital. He later went to Columbia University.

He met Allen Ginsberg while working as a model for the painter Robert La Vigne in San Francisco in December 1954. Prior to meeting Ginsberg, Orlovsky had made no deliberate attempts at becoming a poet. Ginsberg was living with his girlfriend Sheila Williams Boucher at the time, but broke off the relationship to be with Orlovsky. Orlovsky also had a sexual relationship with Boucher during this time. Ginsberg and Orlovsky considered their relationship to be a "marriage sealed by vows." It was an open relationship, in part because Orlovsky was bisexual.

With Ginsberg's encouragement, Orlovsky began writing in 1957 while the pair were living in Paris. Accompanied by other beat writers, Orlovsky traveled extensively for several years throughout the Middle East, Northern Africa, India, and Europe. He also helped produce and contributed vocals to Ginsberg's 1970 LP Songs of Innocence and Experience, based on William Blake's poetry collection of the same name. Orlovsky was Ginsberg's lover in an open relationship until Ginsberg's death in 1997.

In 1974, Orlovsky joined the faculty of the Jack Kerouac School of Disembodied Poetics at the Naropa Institute in Boulder, Colorado, teaching poetry. In 1979 he received a $10,000 grant from the National Endowment for the Arts to continue his creative endeavors.

Death
In May 2010, friends reported that Orlovsky, who had had lung cancer for several months, was moved from his home in St. Johnsbury, Vermont, to the Vermont Respite House in Williston. He died there on May 30, 2010, from complications of the disease; he was 76 years old. He was buried at Shambhala Mountain Center in Red Feather Lakes, Colorado. His epitaph reads: "Train will tug my grave, my breathe hueing gentil vapor between weel & track".

Poetry
 Dear Allen, Ship will land Jan 23, 58 (1971)
 Lepers Cry (1972)
 Clean Asshole Poems & Smiling Vegetable Songs (1978) (reprinted 1992)
 Straight Hearts' Delight: Love Poems and Selected Letters (with Allen Ginsberg) (1980)
 Dick Tracy's Gelber Hut und andere Gedichte (German translation) (1984)
 Sauber abgewischt (German translation by Marcus Roloff) (2020)

His work has also appeared in The New American Poetry 1945–1960 (1960), The Beatitude Anthology (1965), as well as the literary magazines Yugen and Outsider.

Films
Orlovsky appeared in at least six films: Andy Warhol's Couch (1965), Conrad Rooks's Chappaqua (1966), Stan Brakhage's Thot-Fal'N (1978), and three by Robert Frank. Alongside Ginsberg, he acted in Pull My Daisy (co-directed by Alfred Leslie, 1959), a landmark Beat film written and narrated by Kerouac. In Me and My Brother (1969) he appears with his brother Julius, who had been discharged from Bellevue hospital after treatment for schizophrenia. Orlovsky plays a prominent role in C'est Vrai! (One Hour) an hour-long, one-take video Frank made for French television in 1990.

Filmography
 Pull My Daisy (1959)
 Couch (1964)
 Chappaqua (1966)
 Me and My Brother (1969)
Thot-Fal'N (1978)
 C'est Vrai! (One Hour)  (1990)

Notes

References
Charters, Ann (ed.). The Portable Beat Reader. Penguin Books. New York. 1992.  (hc);  (pbk)
Inside Llewyn Davis, The Coen Brothers (2013)

External links

Archival collections 
Peter Orlovsky Papers at the Rare Book & Manuscript Library, Columbia University
Peter Orlovsky's papers at the Harry Ransom Humanities Research Center, University of Texas, Austin
Materials related to Peter Orlovsky in the Robert A. Wilson collection held by the Special Collections, University of Delaware

Other resources 
 
Four Poems
 New York Times obituary
 Obituary in The Independent by Marcus Williamson

1933 births
2010 deaths
American male poets
Beat Generation writers
American writers of Russian descent
American LGBT poets
Writers from New York City
Deaths from lung cancer
Deaths from cancer in Vermont
20th-century American poets
American expatriates in France
LGBT people from New York (state)
20th-century American male writers
Columbia University alumni
American bisexual writers